Mark Erwin Forster (born 1 November 1964) is an English former footballer who scored 13 goals from 38 appearances in the Football League playing as a forward for Darlington, and contributed to their promotion to the Third Division in 1985. He was on the books of Leicester City, but never played for them in the League, and went on to play non-league football for clubs including Guisborough Town and South Bank.

References

1964 births
Living people
Footballers from Middlesbrough
English footballers
Association football forwards
Leicester City F.C. players
Darlington F.C. players
Guisborough Town F.C. players
South Bank F.C. players
English Football League players